Lois Stephens (March 27, 1923 – 2018) was an American equestrian who competed in the 1972 Summer Olympics.

References

External links
 

1923 births
2018 deaths
American female equestrians
American dressage riders
Equestrians at the 1972 Summer Olympics
Olympic equestrians of the United States
Sportspeople from New York City
21st-century American women